The 405 was an independent online magazine based in London, concentrating on music and popular culture. It reported primarily on independent music, film, art, technology and fashion. It published independent music reviews, features, interviews, and media. It was founded in 2008 by Oliver Primus, who was editor until the site closed down. Its first article was published on 28 April 2008. The webzine's name derives from a song on Death Cab For Cutie's We Have the Facts and We're Voting Yes, which itself is a reference to I-405 in Seattle, Washington.

The webzine has partnered with festivals such as Green Man, Iceland Airwaves and Le Guess Who?. The 405 has been recognised by a number of publications such as the BBC, Clash, The Daily Telegraph, The Guardian, Pitchfork, Stereogum, The Independent and NME. The 405 also publishes music premieres, exclusive live performances, podcasts, and playlists. The 405 closed down on 30 November 2019.

References

External links 

Internet properties established in 2008
Companies based in London
British music websites
British entertainment websites
British review websites
Music review websites